Cumbria County Council in England was elected every four years between 1973 and 2017. Since the last boundary changes in 2013, 84 councillors were elected from 84 wards for the last council before abolition in 2023.

Political control
Since 1973 political control of the council has been held by the following parties:

Leadership
The leaders of the council since 1986 have been:

Council elections
1973 Cumbria County Council election
1977 Cumbria County Council election
1981 Cumbria County Council election (boundary changes increased the number of seats by 1)
1985 Cumbria County Council election
1989 Cumbria County Council election
1993 Cumbria County Council election
1997 Cumbria County Council election
2001 Cumbria County Council election (boundary changes reduced the number of seats by 1)
2005 Cumbria County Council election
2009 Cumbria County Council election
2013 Cumbria County Council election
2017 Cumbria County Council election

Election results

County result maps

By-election results

1993-1997

1997-2001

2001-2005

2005-2009

2009-2013

2013-2017

2017-2023

References

By-election results

External links
Cumbria County Council

 
County council elections in England
Council elections in Cumbria